Grimoldy railway station was a station in Grimoldby, Lincolnshire;  opened in 1877 by the Louth and East Coast Railway; and closed in 1960.

References

Disused railway stations in Lincolnshire
Former Great Northern Railway stations
Railway stations in Great Britain opened in 1877
Railway stations in Great Britain closed in 1960